The unicameral National Assembly (Assemblée nationale) is Niger's legislative body. The National Assembly may propose laws and is required to approve all legislation.

History
The National Assembly was established through reforms of the Colony of Niger's Constituent Council during the French colonial period.  It operated from 1958, through independence in 1960, until the 1974 Nigerien coup d'état.  During the course of military rule (1974–1991) a consultative body (the High Council of the Republic of Niger) was reformed to become analogous to a National Assembly. This functioned as a caretaker National Assembly during the Constitutional Convention period of the Second Republic (1991–1993) and was reconstituted as the National Assembly in the Third Republic (1993–1996).  Following the 1996 Nigerien coup d'état the National Assembly was again suspended, and reinstituted in 1997 under the Fourth Republic.  Again, following the 1999 Nigerien coup d'état, the National Assembly was suspended, but this time was reconstituted within the year under the Fifth Republic. (1999–present)

2009 dissolution of assembly

On 27 May 2009, the assembly was dissolved by Tandja Mamadou after his plan to hold a referendum was rejected by the Constitutional Court. Although the court and the National Assembly had only a non-binding advisory role over Tandja's referendum plan, statements by MNSD-Nassara's coalition partners CDS-Rahama indicate the MNSD Prime Minister of Niger, as well as the President, would be open to a censure motion in the assembly.  According to the 1999 constitution, the President is limited to stand for reelection once: Tandja's second five-year term was to end on 22 December 2009. The purpose of the proposed referendum was to scrap the Constitution of the Fifth Republic, creating a new Sixth Republic prior to the November Presidential elections.  Constitutionally, the articles dealing with presidential terms (article 36) may not be revised by any method (article 136). According to Tandja, the people of Niger want him to stay because he has boosted the economy of Niger. The opposition described this act as dictatorship, calling for protests: a continuation of demonstrations which began in December 2008.

Powers
Under the Constitution of the Fifth Republic (18 July 1999), the National Assembly has oversight of the executive in voting on legislation, overriding a Presidential veto, voting no confidence in the Prime Minister, and the reserved right of nominating the Prime Minister.  As well, the Assembly has recourse to publicly investigate the executive through committee hearings, hearing in plenary sittings, commissions of enquiry, formal parliamentary questions, "Question Time", and Interpellations. There is no formal parliamentary ombudsman oversight of government.

Under a presidential system of government briefly instituted in 2009–2010, the National Assembly had no power over the selection of the Prime Minister and could not hold a vote of no confidence in the government; however, it also could not be dissolved by the President. As part of the constitutional change, the introduction of a Senate was planned, at which point the National Assembly would have become the lower house of a bicameral parliament. However, all the changes proved abortive, as President Mamadou Tandja, who had orchestrated them, was ousted in a February 2010 coup.  Mahamadou Issoufou was elected in the 2011 Election and the National Assembly's powers were restored.

Composition
The current National Assembly, formed following elections held on 21 February 2016, has 171 members, up from 113 members in 2003, elected for a five-year term. The multi-seat constituency members are elected using a party-list (Scrutin de liste) proportional representation system.  The remaining eight seats are single constituency, elected by a first-past-the-post system. One element of the Judiciary of Niger, the High Court of Justice, is composed of Deputies elected from within the National Assembly.

Member of the National Assembly for the Nigerien Party for Democracy and Socialism, Ousseini Tinni, was chosen to be the President of the National Assembly after the 2016 elections.

Sessions
The National Assembly sits for two "ordinary" sessions a year, usually the first during March–June and the second from August to October, meeting at the National Assembly Building in Niamey.  So-called "extraordinary" sessions, lasting from a few hours to a week, occur two or more times a year.  Since the year 2000, the National Assembly has ratified between 10 and 30 laws, spending plans, and treaties in each ordinary session.   The internal functioning of the Assembly is governed by the 1999 Constitution of the 5th Republic and by the Law n° 97 – 006/AN of 5 June 1997

See also
Government of Niger
History of Niger
Legislature
List of legislatures by country
List of presidents of the National Assembly of Niger

References

External links 

 
Government of Niger
Niger
Politics of Niger
Political organisations based in Niger
Niamey
Niger